The 1920 Chattanooga Moccasins football team represented the University of Chattanooga (now known as the University of Tennessee at Chattanooga) as a member of the Southern Intercollegiate Athletic Association during the 1920 college football season. In their second season under head coach Silas Williams, the Moccasins completed its 8-game schedule with a record of 3 wins, 4 losses, and 1 tie.

Schedule

References

Chattanooga
Chattanooga Mocs football seasons
Chattanooga Moccasins football